Chal Gerd (also Romanized as Chāl Gerd, Chālgerd, and Chāleh Gerd) is a village in Zaz-e Sharqi Rural District, Zaz va Mahru District, Aligudarz County, Lorestan Province, Iran. At the 2006 census, its population was 67, in 10 families.

References 

Towns and villages in Aligudarz County